James Clifford Culbreath, Jr.  (October 21, 1952 – March 12, 2018) was an American football running back in the National Football League (NFL) for the Green Bay Packers, the New York Giants, and the Philadelphia Eagles.  He played college football at the University of Oklahoma and was drafted in the tenth round of the 1977 NFL Draft.

1952 births
2018 deaths
People from Yeadon, Pennsylvania
American football running backs
Green Bay Packers players
New York Giants players
Philadelphia Eagles players
Oklahoma Sooners football players
Players of American football from Pennsylvania